Serhat Bedük (born 20 April 1979), better known by his surname Bedük, is a Turkish musician, producer, and director.

Bedük had his debut album Nefes Almak Zor released in 2004 by İrem Records. However, his rise to fame was in 2007 with his second album, Even Better released through Audiology Records. In 2009, he released his third album Dance Revolution and instantly gathered massive attention.

Career

Studio albums
 2004: Nefes Almak Zor
 2007: Even Better
 2008: Dance Revolution
 2009: Gel Aşka - Remixes 
 2010: Go
 2011: Ful
 2013: Overload
 2013: On
 2015: Bi Dans Etsek
 2018: Flashforward
 2020: Intergalactic

Remix albums
 2019: Dünya Hep Böyle Dönsün (Remixes)

Singles
 Gel Aşka - Remixes (2009)
 Halkalı Şeker (2014)
 Missing (2016)
 We Dance (2018)
 Gravity (2018)
 Hayvan (2019)
 Raks (2019)
 Push The Buttton (2020)
 Ankara'nın Delisi (2020)

Charts

Videos

Awards

References

External links
 Bedük Official Website

1979 births
Living people
Turkish singer-songwriters
English-language singers from Turkey
21st-century Turkish singers
21st-century Turkish male singers